The Parachute Association of Ireland (PAI) is a national governing body for skydiving in Ireland. It is affiliated to the Fédération Aéronautique Internationale (FAI) through the National Aero Club of Ireland (NACI), and issues the FAI's 'International Parachuting Certificates of Proficiency' to qualified Irish skydivers.

The PAI represents Irish sport parachuting at national and international levels and organises competitive skydiving and parachuting events at a national level.

References

External links
 

Parachuting organizations
Skydiving